A rukun warga (abbreviated RW, literally "pillar of residents") is an administrative division of Indonesia under the village or kelurahan (or under: dusun or village). , and the formation of local communities is through consultation in the framework of community service set by the village or villages. An RW is further divided into rukun tetangga (RT).
Most information about governance and functioning of the RW and RT is in Indonesian.
Some non-Indonesian anthropologists have written about the functions and issues of the RW.

See also 
 Barangay
 Tonarigumi

Notes 

 
Subdivisions of Indonesia

Indonesia, Villages
Law of Indonesia
Society of Indonesia